Yitzchok Zev Halevi Soloveitchik (Hebrew: יצחק זאב הלוי סולובייצ'יק), also known as Velvel Soloveitchik ("Zev" means "wolf" in Hebrew, and "Velvel" is the diminutive of "wolf" in Yiddish) or the Brisker Rov ("rabbi of/from Brisk", (19 October 1886 – 11 October 1959), was an Orthodox rabbi and rosh yeshiva of the Brisk yeshiva in Jerusalem.

A scion of the Soloveitchik rabbinical dynasty, he is commonly referred to as the "GRY"Z" (an acronym for Gaon Rabbi Yitzchok Zev) and "The Rov". He was known for his stringency in halakha (Jewish law) and  advocacy for non-participation in the Israeli political system.

Biography

Yitzchok Zev Soloveitchik was born to Chaim Soloveitchik in Valozhyn. On his mother's side, he was the grandson of Refael Shapiro, a rosh yeshiva in the Volozhin yeshiva.

Soloveitchik moved with his family the Jewish community of Brisk after the czarist government closed the Volozhin yeshiva. He would succeed his father as a rabbi of Brisk and leader of Judaic studies in his region. 

After fleeing the Holocaust and moving to Mandatory Palestine, he re-established the Brisk yeshiva in Jerusalem, where he continued to educate students the way his father did. That system would become known as the Brisker method of studying the Talmud, a form of analysis stressing conceptual understanding combined with strict adherence to the text, with a special emphasis on Maimonides’ work, the Mishneh Torah. 

Soloveitchik was a leader of the Haredi community in Israel. He advocated complete withdrawal of participation in the government, the secular ideals and values of which were, in his view, antithetical to the principles of Orthodox Judaism. He went as far as opposing the reliance on government funding in support of yeshivas and other Torah institutions. This viewpoint was supported by Joel Teitelbaum but disputed by Elazar Shach.

Before he died, Soloveitchik called his son Berel and Elazar Shach and reviewed the decisions and positions he had taken during his lifetime, so that they would scrutinize them and tell them if, in their opinion, he had acted properly.

After Soloveitchik died in Jerusalem, his sons, among them Berel and Meshulam Dovid, split the yeshiva into parts, each taking with them a group of their own followers.

Halakhic approach

Soloveichik was known for his stringency in halakha (Jewish law). This partly stems from his use of the Brisker method of study, in which laws are broken down into precise components, which can then be assembled into new combinations, creating novel halachic possibilities which perhaps a person should be strict to follow or avoid. This, however, does not explain all of his stringencies.

He is reputed to have observed Yom tov sheni shel galuyot (a second day of Yom Tov) in Jerusalem. The practice is normally reserved only for areas outside the Holy Land as a memory for ancient times, when people far from Jerusalem would not hear about the declaration of the new month, and by extension would not know on which day to celebrate the holidays. Soloveitchik's concern revolved around the possibility that the messengers who announced the new month may not have passed by the exact place where he lived in Jerusalem on their way to the Jewish diaspora. Taking this possibility into account, he observed a second day, just to be safe.

In one case, Soloveitchik surprised observers by not following a well-known stringency. Halakha states that on Sukkot, one is required to eat certain foods in a sukkah. It is praiseworthy, but not required, that all eating and drinking take place in the sukkah. Soloveitchik was willing to eat and drink certain foods outside the sukkah, explaining that he is only stringent in areas where there is a chance that the stringency might be required by the halakha, whereas in this case, the halakhic permissiveness is unquestionable.
Soloveitchik was very careful when speaking to not recite from memory rather he would  read all his sources from their original works. Even though he knew them by heart, this comes from the Brisker commitment to truth.

Brisker rabbinic dynasty

See also
 Yehoshua Leib Diskin, another Jewish leader known as the "rabbi from Brisk"
 Naftali Rothenberg, Yair Halevi, ‘’’The Rabbi of Brisk: Rabbi Yitzchok Zev Soloveitchik’’’, in: Benjamin Brown, Nissim Leon, eds. The Gdoilim – Leaders Who Shaped the Israeli Haredi Jewry, Magnes Hebrew University Press, 2017, (Hebrew)

References

1886 births
1959 deaths
People from Valozhyn
People from Oshmyansky Uyezd
Belarusian Haredi rabbis
Haredi rabbis in Israel
Anti-Zionist Haredi rabbis
20th-century Russian rabbis
Haredi rabbis in Mandatory Palestine
20th-century rabbis in Jerusalem
Rosh yeshivas
Soloveitchik rabbinic dynasty
Burials at Har HaMenuchot